Panch Kalyanaka ("Five Auspicious Events") are the five chief auspicious events that occur in the life of tirthankara in Jainism. They are commemorated as part of many Jain rituals and festivals.

Kalyanaka

These auspicious life events are as below:
 Garbh kalyāṇaka: When the ātman (soul) of a tirthankara enter's their mother's womb.
 Janma kalyāṇaka: Birth of the tirthankara. Janmabhisheka  is a ritual celebrating this event in which Indra does abhisheka with 1008 Kalasha (holy vessels) on the tirthankara on Mount Meru.
 Dīkṣā kalyāṇaka: When a tirthankara renounce all worldly possessions and becomes an ascetic.
 Kēvalajñāna kalyāṇaka: The event when a tirthankara attains kēvalajñāna (absolute knowledge). A divine samavasarana (preaching hall) appears, from where the tirthankara delivers sermons and restores the Jain community and teachings.
 Nirvāṇa kalyāṇaka: When a tirthankara leaves their mortal body, it is known as nirvana. It is followed by final liberation, moksha. A tirthankara is considered a Siddha after that.

Kalyanaka Dates of 24 Tirthankara

These dates are called Kalyanaka Tithi.
All dates are considered according to Jain calendar known as Jain Panchang based on the Vira Nirvana Samvat, but they differ according to different sects of Jain tradition and sometimes different within the same tradition also.

The following table states the Kalyanaka Tithis according to the Digambar Jain tradition from the Vira Nirvana Samvat Calendar.

Note: This list is according to Śvētāmbara tradition and months are according to the Gujarati calendar.

Keys

 Dates are in short format. For example, Kartika Shukla 15 means Fifteenth day of Bright fortnight (waxing fortnight) (Sud) of Kartika month, or the Full moon day of the Kartika month.

Kalyanaka Places of 24 Tirthankara
Kalyanaka Bhumi are places where any of these Kalyanaka took place in relation to 24 Tirthankara. They are considered places of pilgrimage by Jains. 20 out of 24 Tirthankaras' Nirvana kalyanaka took place at Shikharji.

They are as below:

Rituals
Some Jain rituals have close relationship with these five Kalyanakas. Panch Kalyanaka Puja is a ritual solemnizes all five Kalyanaka. It was narrated by Pandit Virvijay. Snatra Puja is a ritual related to Janma Kalyanaka in which icons of Tirthankara are bathed symbolising Indra doing Abhisheka on Tirthankara on Mount Meru after birth of Tirthankara. It performed before many other rituals and before starting of new enterprises, birthdays.

When a new Jain Temple is erected, these Five Auspicious Life Events are celebrated known as Panch Kalyanaka Pratishtha Mahotsava. It is followed by Anjana Shalaka, a ceremony to install new Tirthankara icon. An Acharya recite mantras related to Panch Kalyanaka followed by applying special paste to eyes of Tirthankara image. After these an icons of Tirthankara gets a status of real Tirthankara which can be worshipped by Jains. Acharya have to fast for three days before that.

Festivals
Many Jain festivals mark Kalyanaka of Tirthankara especially Janma and Nirvana Kalyanaka.

Mahavir Janma Kalyanak marks Janma Kalyanak (birth) of 24th Tirthankara, Mahavira. Abhisheka of icons are done on this day and procession celebrating this event takes place in the cities. It is on 13th day of bright half of Chaitra month of Jain calendar (March/April).

Diwali is a day of Nirvana Kalyanaka of Mahavira. He attained Moksha on this day in 527 BCE. It falls on fifteenth day of dark half of Ashwin (Aaso) month (September/October) which is also a last day of a year.

Pausha Dashmi is celebrated on 10th day of dark half of Pausha (Pushya) month of Hindu calendar(December/January). It marks Janma kalyanaka (birth) of 23rd Tirthankara, Parshvanath. Three days fast is observed by many Jains.

Maun Agiyaras or Ekadashi marks Kalyanaka of many Tirthankaras. It is celebrated on 11th day of Magshar month of Jain calendar (October/November). On this day, complete silence is observed and fasting is kept. Meditation is also performed.

See also

 Pañca-Parameṣṭhi
 God in Jainism
 Jain symbols

References

Citations

Sources
 

Jain festivals